The Battle of Smithfield Crossing was a small battle during the American Civil War fought August 25 through August 29, 1864, in Jefferson and Berkeley counties in West Virginia.

Battle

On August 29, two Confederate infantry divisions under Lieutenant General Jubal Early crossed Opequon Creek at Smithfield Crossing and forced back Wesley Merritt's Union cavalry division. However, a counterattack from Ricketts' infantry division stopped the Confederate advance. Rebel troops were never ordered to attempt another advance, and ultimately the results were inconclusive. It was the last engagement of the war to take place in West Virginia.

Preservation
The battle, ranks in the top 3 percent of the more than 16,000 recorded armed encounters in the Civil War. The Middleway Conservancy Organization, commemorated the 150th anniversary of the Battle of Smithfield Crossing in August 2014. To expand the community's knowledge and interest in this battle, the Conservancy hosts a living history event and reenactment of the battle.

External links
 American Battlefield Protection Program description
 A brief description of the Confederacy pushing back Union troops is found in the commanding officer of the Fifth Louisiana Regiment's diary entry on August 29, 1864.
 CWSAC Report Update and Resurvey: Individual Battlefield Profiles

Notes

Valley campaigns of 1864
Battles of the Eastern Theater of the American Civil War
Inconclusive battles of the American Civil War
Berkeley County, West Virginia, in the American Civil War
Jefferson County, West Virginia in the American Civil War
Battles of the American Civil War in West Virginia
August 1864 events